The British & Irish Lions toured New Zealand during June and July 2017. The Lions, a rugby union team selected from players eligible to represent England, Ireland, Scotland or Wales, played ten matches: against all five New Zealand Super Rugby franchises, the NZ Provincial Barbarians, the Māori All Blacks and three test matches against New Zealand.

The test series was drawn 1–1 – one victory each and a draw in the third match. Of the other tour matches, the Lions won four, lost two and drew one.

Wales coach Warren Gatland was head coach of the Lions, having also led the Lions to victory in the 2013 series against Australia. Former Wales captain Sam Warburton was appointed as tour captain, a role he also held on the 2013 tour. The Lions squad voted Jonathan Davies their player of the series.

Schedule
The ten-match schedule was announced on 9 July 2015, and included matches against New Zealand Super Rugby teams for the first time. Previously in New Zealand, the Lions had played provincial sides or combined provincial selections. However, this was the first tour to New Zealand where the visit fell in the middle of the Super Rugby season.

Initially, the Lions proposed a match in the United States against the U.S. national team to open the tour, much like the Barbarians match in Hong Kong in 2013. However, on 6 July 2015, the idea was dropped because of the unavailability of key American players due to club commitments. The opening match of the tour was originally planned to be against a Provincial Union XV, but this was changed to the New Zealand Barbarians  in March 2016, following their win over the Māori All Blacks.

Christchurch was initially planned to host a test match but, due to the 2011 Christchurch earthquake which damaged Lancaster Park beyond repair, it was deemed that the remaining stadiums in the South Island were too small to host a test match.

Squads

Lions
Tour manager John Spencer announced an initial squad of 41 on 19 April 2017, made up of 16 players from England, 12 from Wales, 11 from Ireland and 2 from Scotland.

Ben Youngs was initially selected in the squad but withdrew on 6 May for personal reasons.

Billy Vunipola withdrew from the squad on 21 May after suffering a shoulder injury while playing for his club Saracens.

On 17 June, six players – Kristian Dacey, Gareth Davies, Allan Dell, Tomas Francis, Cory Hill and Finn Russell – were added to the squad to provide cover during mid-week games ahead of the test series. Ross Moriarty was ruled out of the tour after an injury sustained against the New Zealand Provincial Barbarians.

On 29 June, Robbie Henshaw and George North were ruled out of the remaining games after sustaining injuries against the Hurricanes.

Jared Payne was ruled out of the final game due to concussion.

Notes: Ages listed are as of the first tour match on 3 June. Player positions are per the Lions' website. Bold denotes that the player was selected for a previous Lions squad. Italic denotes a player that withdrew from the squad following selection.

Management and staff

On 30 July 2014, former English international player John Spencer was named the Lions' tour manager.

On 7 September 2016, Warren Gatland was confirmed as the Lions' head coach and named his assistants on 7 December 2016 – Steve Borthwick, Andy Farrell and Rob Howley. Howley was on his fifth tour, having previously toured as a player (1997 and 2001) and coach (2009 and 2013). Borthwick was making his first tour as a Lions coach and Farrell was on his second, after being part of the coaching staff in 2013.

New Zealand
New Zealand's 33-man squad for their Pasifika Challenge match against Samoa and their three-test series against the British & Irish Lions.

Liam Coltman, Vaea Fifita, Jack Goodhue, Akira Ioane and Matt Todd were also named in the squad as injury cover.

Following concussion to Ben Smith in the first test, Damian McKenzie was added to the squad as cover for Ben Smith.

On 3 July, Malakai Fekitoa was called up as a replacement for Sonny Bill Williams who was suspended after a red card in the second test.

All squad members play rugby in New Zealand.

Coaching team:
 Head coach:  Steve Hansen
 Attack coach:  Ian Foster
 Forwards coach:  Mike Cron
 Defence coach:  Wayne Smith

Note: Ages, caps and clubs as per first test match, 24 June 2017.

Matches

Provincial games

As well as the test series, the Lions played tour matches against New Zealand provincial teams. For the first time since the establishment of Super Rugby, this included playing all five of New Zealand's Super Rugby teams. The current form of the Super Rugby teams made this tour arguably one of the toughest undertaken by a British & Irish Lions team.

The Lions arrived in New Zealand just two days before their first match against a Provincial Barbarians team. The Barbarian team was made up of players on the fringe of New Zealand Super Rugby teams, and included Bryn Gatland, son of Lions coach Warren Gatland. The Barbarians led 7–3 at half time, before Anthony Watson scored for the visitors to give them the lead with 30 minutes to go. They held on to open the tour with an unconvincing 13–7 victory.

The next match was four days later against the Blues, an Auckland-based Super Rugby franchise. The Lions led 16–15 with 10 minutes remaining before a Sonny Bill Williams break and offload to Ihaia West led to the match-winning try. A try-less 12–3 victory over the Crusaders in Christchurch followed. This was the first time the Crusaders had lost in 2017. It was another close game against the Highlanders, and Marty Banks from the Otago-based side kicked the winning penalty with six minutes remaining.

The next match was against the Māori All Blacks, a team made up of players with Maori ancestry. A strong squad was named, with nine players with All Black caps selected. The Lions beat the Maori team with ease in what was predicted to be the toughest match before meeting the All Blacks. The convincing 32–10 victory was followed up three days later as they put another dominant display against the Chiefs in Hamilton, winning 34–6. The final mid-week game against the Hurricanes was played after the first All Black test match. The Hurricanes came from behind to secure a 31–31 draw in Wellington.

Test matches
New Zealand were favourites, coming into the first test match having won 46 tests in a row at home and undefeated at Eden Park in 23 years. Peter O'Mahony was named Lions captain by Warren Gatland for the first test. Sam Warburton lost his position to Seán O'Brien, making him the first tour captain not to play in the first test in 87 years. Apart from a new-look back three of Anthony Watson, Liam Williams and Elliot Daly, Gatland picked a predictable squad. So too did All Blacks coach Steve Hansen, his only surprise being the elevation of 20-year-old Rieko Ioane for his first start over the veteran winger Julian Savea.

First test
The first test was a close match during the first half, Codie Taylor's try for the All Blacks being matched by one from the Lions' Seán O'Brien, and the home side led 13–8 at the break; however in the second half Rieko Ioane's two tries took the game away from the Lions, with Rhys Webb's try bringing the score back to 30–15.

Notes
 On his test debut for the Lions, Peter O'Mahony became the 11th Irishman to captain the team.
 New Zealand's 15-point winning margin marked the heaviest defeat for the Lions since the third test against New Zealand in 2005.
 This defeat was the Lions' third of the tour, the most defeats on a tour since 2005, when they were beaten four times.
 The match marked New Zealand's fifth consecutive victory over the Lions, having last been beaten in the second test in 1993.

Second test
The second test was notable for the sending off of Sonny Bill Williams, leaving the All Blacks 55 minutes to play with 14 men. At half time, the score remained 9–9, but Beauden Barrett kicked New Zealand into an 18–9 lead before Taulupe Faletau and Conor Murray tries levelled the game at 21–21. On 76 minutes, Charlie Faumuina was penalised for tackling Kyle Sinckler in the air, and Owen Farrell kicked the winning penalty.

Notes:
 Ngani Laumape (New Zealand) made his international debut.
 Sonny Bill Williams (New Zealand) was only the third New Zealand player to be sent off, and the first since Colin Meads against Scotland in New Zealand's 1967 northern hemisphere tour.
 This was the British & Irish Lions' first win over New Zealand since winning 20–7 during their 1993 tour, and was their first win over New Zealand in the professional era.
 The British & Irish Lions ended New Zealand's 47-match home winning streak, the All Blacks' first loss since their 32–29 defeat to South Africa in 2009.
 This was the first time that New Zealand failed to score any tries in a game since they drew 12–12 with Australia in 2014, and the first time since beating Australia 12–6 in 2002 that they failed to score any tries in a home game.

Third test
New Zealand led 12–6 at the break, with tries from Laumape and Jordie Barrett, but the Lions fought their way back into the game, and eventually five penalties (four from Owen Farrell and one from Elliot Daly) were enough to draw the game. There was controversy with two minutes left when Ken Owens was initially adjudged to have handled the ball in an offside position after Liam Williams tried to claim a high kick under pressure from Kieran Read; with the scores level, referee Poite initially awarded a penalty in kicking range before overturning it to a scrum after discussion with the video officials.	

Notes:
 Kieran Read (New Zealand) became the seventh All Black to reach 100 test caps.	
 Aaron Cruden and Charlie Faumuina (both New Zealand) earned their 50th test caps.
 This was the first time the Lions and New Zealand had drawn a test match since their 14–14 draw in 1971, and the first time the Lions had drawn any test match since their 13–13 draw with South Africa in 1974.
 This was the first British & Irish Lions series drawn with New Zealand, and the first against any side since the 2–2 draw with South Africa in 1955.
 This was the first time since New Zealand drew with South Africa 18–18 in 1994 that they have failed to win a game at Eden Park.

Statistics

Lions player statistics
Key
Con: Conversions
Pen: Penalties
DG: Drop goals
Pts: Points

Test match statistics
Key
Con: Conversions
Pen: Penalties
DG: Drop goals
Pts: Points

Broadcasting
Sky Sport was the host broadcaster. Sky Sports televised the tour in the UK and Ireland and S4C showed highlights throughout the UK in the Welsh language. In addition to Sky Sports, Talksport provided exclusive live UK radio commentary.

Other broadcasters included Fox Sports in Australia, SuperSport in South Africa, Sky Sport in Italy, Eir Sport in Asia and ESPN in the USA.

Sponsors
Land Rover and Ernst & Young (EY) were principal partners of the Lions while Standard Life was the main sponsor for the Lions, sponsoring their shirts on tour.

References

External links
 Official Site

2016–17 in British rugby union
2016–17 in Irish rugby union
2017 in New Zealand rugby union
2017 rugby union tours
2017
June 2017 sports events in New Zealand
July 2017 sports events in New Zealand